The Wabasha Street Caves is an event hall built into the sandstone caves located on the south shore of the Mississippi River in downtown Saint Paul, Minnesota. The caves have been home to mobsters, speakeasies, and for the past 30 years have hosted Swing Night every Thursday night with professional live Big Bands and vocalists, playing music of the old Tommy Dorsey, Glenn Miller, Count Basie, Duke Ellington Big Bands. Dances are open to the public and draw crowds in the hundreds.  The Wabasha Street Caves also provide historical tours and Murder Mystery Tours in these sandstone caves in Saint Paul, Minnesota near the Mississippi River.[2] Moonlight Serenaders Big Band

History

The caves, which technically are mines because they are manmade, are carved out of sandstone and date back to the 1840s.  Throughout history the caves have been used for a number of different activities, including growing mushrooms, storage of food and belongings, music, and dancing.

In the 1920s, the caves were used as a restaurant and nightclub venue known as the Wabasha Street Speakeasy. The speakeasy was said to have been frequented by gangsters such as John Dillinger and Ma Barker, however there is no evidence that these visits occurred; thus, these stories are considered legend.

On October 26, 1933, Josie & William Lehmann opened the Castle Royal, which was built into the side of the caves.  Castle Royal was closed in the late 1930s due to the start of World War II and went back to primarily being a place to grow mushrooms.  Some time in the 1970s, Castle Royal 2 was opened as a venue for Disco music.  The caves have also been used as a place of storage for debris and belongings that were washed up from flooding.  Some of these things can still be found in the caves today.

References

External links
Wabasha Street Caves Website

Caves of Minnesota
Culture of Saint Paul, Minnesota
Geography of Saint Paul, Minnesota
Music venues in Minnesota
Nightclubs in the United States
Tourist attractions in Saint Paul, Minnesota
Landforms of Ramsey County, Minnesota